The 2021 ESF Women's Championship was an international European softball competition that was held in Friuli Venezia Giulia, Italy from 27 June to 3 July 2021.

Round 1

Group A

References

European Championship
Women's Softball European Championship
Softball competitions in Italy
June 2019 sports events in Italy
July 2019 sports events in Italy